Alexander Edwards (1885–1918) was a Scottish recipient of the Victoria Cross

Alexander Edwards may also refer to:
Alexander Edwards (politician) (1876–1938), Canadian businessman and politician

Alex Edwards may refer to:
Alex Edwards (born 1975), English cricketer
Alex Edwards (footballer) (born 1946), Scottish Association footballer

See also
Al Edwards (disambiguation)